The Baillie Gifford Prize for Non-Fiction, formerly the Samuel Johnson Prize, is an annual British book prize for the best non-fiction writing in the English language. It was founded in 1999 following the demise of the NCR Book Award. With its motto "All the best stories are true", the prize covers current affairs, history, politics, science, sport, travel, biography, autobiography and the arts. The competition is open to authors of any nationality whose work is published in the UK in English. The longlist, shortlist and winner is chosen by a panel of independent judges, which changes every year. Formerly named after English author and lexicographer Samuel Johnson, the award was renamed in 2015 after Baillie Gifford, an investment management firm and the primary sponsor. Since 2016, the annual dinner and awards ceremony has been sponsored by the Blavatnik Family Foundation. 

The prize is governed by the Board of Directors of The Samuel Johnson Prize for Non-fiction Limited, a not-for-profit company. Since 2018, the Chair of the Board has been Sir Peter Bazalgette, who succeeded Stuart Proffitt, the chair since 1999. In 2015, Toby Mundy was appointed as the Prize's first director.

first

History
Prior to the establishment of the Samuel Johnson Prize, Britain's premier literary award for non-fiction was the NCR Book Award which had been established in 1987. In 1997, the NCR Award experienced a scandal when it was revealed the judges, many of them chosen for their popularity rather than literary qualities, had used "ghost readers" and were not expected to read the books they voted on. Because of this and other problems the award ceased operations. In response, one of the previous winners of NCR Award, the historian Peter Hennessy, approached Stuart Proffitt, a Publishing Director at Penguin Press, with the idea for a new award. An anonymous benefactor was found who funded the establishment of the Prize, which was named after the English 18th-century author and lexicographer Samuel Johnson.

From its inception through 2001, the prize was independently financed by the founding benefactor. In 2002, it was taken over by the BBC and re-named the BBC Four Samuel Johnson Prize and managed by BBC Four. In 2009, the name was amended to the BBC Samuel Johnson Prize for Non-Fiction and managed by BBC Two. The new name reflected the BBC's commitment to broadcasting coverage of the Prize on the BBC2 programme, The Culture Show. In 2016, the name was changed to the Baillie Gifford Prize for Non-Fiction, after its new primary sponsor, the Edinburgh-based investment management company Baillie Gifford. 

Prior to the 2009 name change, the winner received , and each finalist received . In 2015, funding for the prize was arranged by the Blavatnik Family Foundation, while the organisers sought new primary sponsors from 2016 onwards.

In 2019, following the announcement that Baillie Gifford will sponsor the award until at least 2026, the prize money was increased to £50,000.

It is widely recognised as the UK's most prestigious award for non-fiction authors.

Winners and shortlists

1990s

2000s

2010s

2020s

25th Anniversary Winner of Winners Award 
In 2023, marking the 25th anniversary of the prize, a one-off 'Winner of Winners' Award was announced. The judging panel was chaired by Jason Cowley (New Statesman editor-in-chief) and included Shahidha Bari (academic, critic and broadcaster), Sarah Churchwell (journalist, author and academic), and Frances Wilson (biographer and critic).

See also 
 British literature
 English literature
 List of years in literature
 List of literary awards
 Prizes named after people

Notes

References

External links
 
 
 

1999 establishments in the United Kingdom
Awards established in 1999
BBC awards
British non-fiction literary awards
Samuel Johnson
English-language literary awards